Apapantilla Totonac, or Xicotepec Totonac (Xicotepec de Juárez), is a Totonac language of central Mexico. Zihuateutla Totonac may be a separate language.

References

Totonacan languages